Railway accidents may be classified by their effects, e.g.: head-on collisions, rear-end collisions, side collisions, derailments, fires, explosions, etc. They may alternatively be classified by cause, e.g.: driver and signalman error; mechanical failure of rolling stock, tracks and bridges; vandalism, sabotage and terrorism; level crossing misuse and trespassing; natural causes such as flooding and fog; hazards of dangerous goods carried; effectiveness of brakes; and adequacy of operating rules.

India's deadliest rail accident was the Bihar train disaster (750+ killed), further were the Firozabad rail disaster (358 killed), the Gaisal train disaster (285 killed), Khanna rail disaster (212 killed), 2002 Rajdhani Express accident (200 killed), 1964 Rameswaram cyclone causing Pamban Bridge accident (150+ killed) and the Jnaneswari Express train derailment (148 killed).

The following is an incomplete chronological list of railway accidents and incidents in India.

1900s
 24 October 1907 – A passenger train collided with a freight train at Kot Lakhpat station, killing 11 and injuring 27.
 2 December 1908 – Two mail trains collided at Barara station, killing 22 and injuring 24.

1920s
 27 April 1920 – An Express train collided with a goods train near Moradabad resulting in 120 deaths and 50 injuries.
 7 October 1920 – The Madras–Bangalore mail train derailed around  past Arakkonam, killing 40 people.

1930s
 28 June 1939 – A train accident resulted in 10 killed and 21 injured.

1940s

1950s
 12 April 1950 – The Kumaon Express derailed and crashed into a river, killing 50 people.
 7 May 1950 – A train plunged off a bridge in the state of Bihar, killing at least 81 people and injuring 100.
 June 1953 – A passenger train and freight train collided between Sempaore and Kalihar, killing 5 and injuring 50.
 4 January 1954 – A passenger train derailed while crossing a bridge near Bhatinda, killing at least 15 people and injuring 40.
 31 March 1954 – Explosives being transported on a passenger train detonated near Gorakhpur, killing 31 and injuring 32.
 27 September 1954 – Derailment of 319 Down Express at a girder bridge between Jangaon and Raghunathpalli stations on 27 September 1954, resulting in the death of 136 persons.
At least 125 were killed and 22 injured.
 2 June 1957 – A passenger train crashed into a stationary train in Bombay, killing 18 and injuring 53.
 23 July 1957 – Tatanagar Train collision happened outside the Down outer signal of Tatanagar between Gua-Tata passenger and 304 Down Hazaribagh-Ranchi-Howrah Express running on the Adityapur-Tatanagar section.
19 August 1957 – Howrahbound Janata Express was in an accident between Palasa and Pundi stations on the South Eastern Railway. 4 persons were killed, 3 on the spot and 1 subsequently in the Palasa Railway Dispensary. 9 were injured seriously.
The Explosion of wagon loaded with crackers at Katpadi Junstion on 21 August 1957 17:30 hrs 5 persons killed on spot and 12 persons injuries.
 Train collision at Kosma Railway Station on 8 November 1957 Shikohabad-Farukhabad Broad Gauge single line section of the Northern Railway
 23 November 1957 – Four coaches of the Bombay-Calcutta Mail capsized upon derailment near Padali, causing 9 deaths and 54 injuries.
 21 May 1958 – An express train derailed near Chamaraj, killing 31 people and injuring 41.

1960s
 4 January 1961 – Two passenger trains collided head-on near Umeshnagar, killing 35 and injuring 61.
 8 March 1961 – A passenger train and freight train collided between Kalihar and Bihar, killing 11 and injuring 37.
 20 October 1961 – The Ranchi Express derailed  from Kolkata, killing 47 and injuring many others.
 22 July 1962 – The Howrah bound Punjab Mail crashed into a goods train at Dumraon railway station, resulting in over 100 fatalities.
 12 November 1962 – 25 passengers riding on the roof of a train were killed when they were struck by a bridge girder.
 23 December 1964 – The Pamban–Dhanuskodi passenger train was washed away by the Rameswaram cyclone, killing over 126 passengers on board.
 16 February 1966 – A Mail Express train in Assam was bombed by Naga separatists, killing 27.
 20 April 1966 – A train at the Lumding railway station was bombed by Naga separatists, killing 55 and wounding 127.
 23 April 1966 – A train at the Diphu railway station was bombed by Naga separatists, killing 40 and wounding 60.
 13 June 1966 – Two passenger trains collided near Matunga railway station, killing at least 57 people and injuring 100.
 19 March 1968 – The Bangalore-bound Deccan Express from Poona and the Birur–Hubli passenger train collided at Yalvigi station on the Harihar-Hubli section of the Southern Railway, killing 53 and injuring 42.
 4 February 1969 – Passengers riding on the top of a train were swept off by the girders of a bridge near Madras. 32 people were killed and 50 injured.
 21 June 1969 – Six passenger cars of express crashed by left a tracks and roared into Magari River, killing 70 and injuring 130 in Muhammadabad.
 14 July 1969 – A freight train crashed into a stationary passenger train at Jaipur, killing 85 and injuring 130.

1970s
28 April 1970 – Collision of 31 Up Barauni Kanpur Passenger Train at Lucknow Junction of Northern Railway.
29 May 1970 – Derailment of 18up Delhi-Madras Janata Express Train at Talamanchi Station, South Central Railway.
28 September 1970 – Derailment of 6 Down Amritsar-Howrah Mail at Karna Station, Northern Railway.
26 October 1970 – Head on Collision between 1 Ajd Up Passenger Train and 456 Down Goods Train at Khurja Jn. Station of Northern Railway.
31 October 1970 – Collision between No.1 Down Madras-Mangalore Mail and No.19 Down Madras Cochin Mail at Perambur Station of Southern Railway.
5 November 1970 – Collision of Down Diesel Erb Special 1 with 46 Down (Hyderabad-Howrah Express) between Retang and Bhubaneswar Stations on the East Coast Main Line of the South Eastern Railway.
6 January 1971 – Collision between R 81 Up Ranaghat Local and T151 Up Barasat Local Trains at Dum Dum Jn. Station of Eastern Railway.
25 April 1971 – Head on Collision between No. 102 Do-4 Up Goods Train and No. 395 Wardha Kazipet Passenger Train Near Asifabad Road Station of the South Central Railway.
26 June 1971 – 228 Up Borivli-Churchgate Suburban Train met with an accident at Goregaon Yard of Western Railway.
6 July 1971 – Head-On collisions, First between Up and Down Light Engines and then Between SD 103 Up Passenger Train and the Up Light Engine between Hotar and Magra Hat Stations of Eastern Railway.
11 November 1971 – Lucknow Store Incharge V.K. Bisaria found dead at Railway Track in different pieces. 
26 April 1972 – A train derailed in Mysore state, killing 21 and injuring 37.
28 June 1972 – Derailment of 222 Down Udaipur City-Marwar Jn. Passenger Train Between Phulad and Marwar Ranawas Stations of Western Railway.
27 July 1973 – Collision of 87 Up South Bihar Express with The Rear of 5 Up Howrah Amritsar Mail at Km. 291.767 between Joramow Block Hut and Madhupur Junction Station of Eastern Railway.
12 December 1973 – Rear end Collision between 358 Up Itarsi-Bhusaval Passenger and Stationary Goods Train No.L-30 Up at Burhanpur Station of Central Railway.
21 February 1974 – A passenger train crashed into a freight train at Moradabad, killing 41 and injuring 63.
9 March 1974 – Derailment of 662 Up Mixed Train between Sillipur and Birpur Stations on Sheopur Kalan Gwalior Narrow Gauge Section of Jhansi Division on Central Railway.
2 July 1974 – Rear-End Collision of 55 Up Patna Delhi Express with Stationary Up Amritsar Special Goods at Chandausi Junction Station of Northern Railway.
12 November 1974 – Fire on 311 Up Sealdah Samastipur Fast Passenger between Rampur Dumra and Hatidih Link Cabin on Danapur Division of Eastern Railway.
26 February 1975 – Derailment of 59up Kamrup Express between New Jalpaiguri and Ambari Falakata Stations of Northeast Frontier Railway.
11 July 1975 – Collision of 6 Up Punjab Mail with Up Diesel Special Goods Train at Khirkiya Station of Central Railway.
29 January 1975 – Collision of 43 Up Darjeeling Mail with the rear of H. 185 Up HABRA Local on the Up Main Line at Ultadanga Road Station on Eastern Railway.
26 March 1975 – Derailment of 365 Up Sealdah Lalgola Passenger Train at the Up Facing Points of Birnagar Station at 89/14-16 on Sealdah Lalgola Section of Eastern Railway.
26 November 1975 – Derailment of No.20 Up Dehra Dun Express at Virar Station on The Valsad-Bombay Central Broad Gauge Section of Western Railway.
6 January 1976 – Derailment of No.20 Up Cochin Harbour Terminus Madras Central Mail between Mukundarayapuram and Walajah Road Junction Stations of Southern Railway.
24 May 1976 – Collision of Kurla Wiring Train with The Rear of N-9 Down Local Train on The Down Main Line at ES. 23/12 between Vikhroli and Kanjur Marg Stations on the Bombay Kalyan B.G. Section of Central Railway.
14 July 1976 – Derailment of 234 Down Mixed Train between Golaghat and Furkating M.G. Section of Tinsukia Division of Northeast Frontier Railway.
30 August 1976 – Derailment of 59 Up Kamrup Express at Km 195/ 1-4 between Samsi and Bhaluka Droad Stations on Malda Town New Jalpaiguri Broad Gauge Section of Katihar Division of Northeast Frontier Railway.
11 October 1976 – Derailment of 23 Up Patna Hatia Express between Silli and Kita Stations on Muri Hatia Section of South Eastern Railway.
23 October 1976 – Derailment 5 of No. 371 Sown Suburban Train at Bandra Station of the Bombay Suburban Section of Western Railway.
17 November 1976 – Double collision, first of Oja Special Goods Train with the rear of Wjd-12 Up Goods Train and subsequently of No. 78up Vijayawada Madras Parcel Passenger with the rear of the Oja Special Goods Train between the Up Distance and Up Home signals of Srivenkateswarapalem of South Central Railway.
7 February 1977 – Derailment of 104 Down Kathgodam Bareilly Passenger in The Catch Siding at Haldwani Station of Izzatnagar Division of North Eastern Railway.
25 March 1977 – Collision of Up BPQD Goods Train with the rear of No.76up Waltair Kazipet Passenger Train on the Up Main Line of Kesamudram Station on Vijayawada Kazypet Bg Double Line Section of South Central Railway.
20 April 1977 – Derailment of 367 Up Sealdah-Lalgola Passenger Train at Km. 52/27-53/II, in Madanpur Station Yard, on Sealdah Ranaghat Section in Sealdah Division of Eastern Railway.
27 May 1977 – Collision of No. 20 Up Trivandrum Central Madras Central Mail Train with two Coupled Light Engines at Km. 117/4-5 in Tiruvalam Station Yard on the Jolarpettai Madras Double Line Broad Gauge Section of Southern Railway.
30 May 1977 – A bridge across the Beki river near Guwahati collapsed under 13 Up Tezpur Express, killing at least 45 people and injuring 100.
4 August 1977 – Derailment of 2 Dsu Passenger Train at Modinagar Station of Delhi Division of Northern Railway.
10 October 1977 – Collision between 103 Up Howrah-Amritsar Deluxe Express Train and Up CPC Special Goods Train at Naini Station on Allahabad Division of Northern Railway at 00.15 Hrs
17 October 1977-Derailment of No.107 Down Madras Rameswaram Passenger Train between Paramakkudi and Pandikanmoi Stations on the ManamaduraiRameswaram Single Line Meter Gauge Section of Southern Railway.
9 November 1977- Collision of No. 385 Down Bhusaval Nagpur Passenger Train with Coupled Light Engines of No.D-30 Up Goods Train on The Down Main Line of Akola Station on The Bhusaval Badnera Double Line Broad Gauge Section of Central Railway.
23 November 1977 – A passenger train derailed near Rewari, probably due to sabotage of the rail tracks. 20 people were killed and 21 others seriously injured.
9 February 1978 – Collision of No. 38 Down Madras Howrah Janata Express with the Rear of No. Jbd-Ii Down Goods Train on the Down Loop Line of Vedayapalem Station on the Gudur Bitragunta Double Line Broad Gauge Section of The South Central Railway.
 18 April 1978 – 7 Dn Bombay Ahmedabad Janta Express crashed into the rear of 537 Down Churchgate Virar Suburban Train at Bassain Road station in Bombay, killing 30 and injuring 60.
26 August 1978 – Collision between Madras New Delhi Grand Trunk Express Train and A Run Away Box Wagon between Tondalagopavaram & Errupalem Stations on Vijaywada Kazipet Section of South Central Railway.
18 September 1978 – No.40up Ahmedabad Bombay Passenger Train met with an accident at Valsad Station on The Surat Bombay Central Broad Gauge Double Line Route of Western Railway.
11 October 1978 – Collision between No. 316up Miraj Pune Passenger and M-32 LNN Down Diesel Goods between Bhavani Nagar and Takari Stations of The Miraj Pune B.G. Single Line Section of South Central Railway.
4 November 1978 – 1 Up Howrah Kalka mail derailed between Baruipara and Kamarkundu of eastern railway.
11 November 1978 – Collision between No. 316up Miraj Pune Passenger and M-32 LNN Down Diesel Goods between Bhavani Nagar and Takari Stations of the Miraj Pune B.G. Single Line Section of South Central Railway.
21 December 1978 – 2636 UP Madurai – Madras Vaigai Superfast Express dashed against two boulders between Talanallur and Vridhachalam Town station of Chord line.
12 May 1979 – Derailment of 3 Pn Up (Pathankot-Nagrota) Passenger Train at Km. 37/5-6 between Talara and Jawanwala Shah Stations on Pathankot Joginder Nagar Narrow Gauge Section in Firozpur Division of Northern Railway.
18 May 1979 – Collision of K. 121 Up Howrah-Kharagur Local with the rear of 3 Up Howrah-Madras Mail at Km.25/25-27 on the Up Line between Bauria and Chengail Stations.
26 October 1979 – Rear End Collision between Electric Multiple Unit Trains No. E-65 and No.E-67 on The Down Subudrban Line at Madras Egmore Station on Madras Beach Tambaram Suburban Meter Gauge Section of Southern Railway.
14 November 1979 – Two trains collided near Matunga, killing 5 and injuring 50.
22 November 1979 – Derilment of 6 Up Bg Saurashtra (Viramgam Bombay Central ) Mail at Sabarmati and subsequent collision of 24down Mg Somnath (Ahmedabad Veraval) Mail with The Derailed Luggage Van of 6 Up Mail.
3 December 1979 – Derailment of No. 204 Down Miraj Bangalore Mahalaxmi Express Train Near Lalhond Halt Station between Desur and Khanapur Stations of the Miraj Hubli Meter Gauge Section of South Central Railway.
8 December 1979 – Collision of No. T-181 Down Bombay V.T. Thane Suburban Train with No.Tl-31 Down Bombay V.T. Titvala Suburban train at Km. 21/3-4 between Ghatkopar and Vikhroli Quadruple Line Broad Gauge Suburban Section of Bombay Division, Central Railway.
23 December 1979 – 1 Dn Avadh-Trihut Mail crashed into the rear of the standing 26 Dn Guwahati Dhubri passenger train near Sarupeta, killing 18 and injuring 25.

1980s
 12 February 1981 – A freight train, the No. 20 Madras Mail from Trivandrum Central Trivandrum Mail, and the Yercaud Express collided with each other while on the same route in Vaniyambadi,  from Chennai.
 6 June 1981 – The Bihar train derailment occurred when a train fell into the river Bagmati while crossing a bridge, killing between 300 and 800 people.
 16 July 1981 – A freight train collided with the back of a Narmada Express in Madhya Pradesh, between Khodri and Bhanwar Tonk station, killing 50 people and injuring 49.
 19 July 1981 – A train traveling to Ahmedabad from New Delhi derailed in Gujarat, killing 30 people and injuring 70. Sabotage was blamed.
 31 July 1981 – Six coaches of a train derail near Bahawalpur, killing 43 and injuring 50.
 27 January 1982 – A freight train and an express passenger train collided head-on in heavy fog near Agra, killing 50 and injuring 50.
 20 March 1982 – A Mangalore–New Delhi train collided with a tourist bus at a level crossing in Andhra Pradesh, killing at least 59 people on the bus and injuring 25 others.
 10 February 1984 – The 2 DR (Rohtak–Delhi) train collided into the rear coaches of the stationary 38 Down Punjab Mail on platform No. 3 of Bahadurgarh station in Haryana, killing 43 and injuring 58.
 15 September 1984 – Jabalpur Gondia passenger mishap occurred when a passenger train sunk in river near Charegaon, Balaghat, Madhya Pradesh, killing over 150 people.
 22 November 1984 – Mumbai local rail disaster occurred where one train collided with other train on the Byculla railway station.
 23 February 1985 – Rajnandgaon train fire occurred when an express train caught fire in Madhya Pradesh, killing over 50 people.
13 June 1985 – Agra rail disaster involved a collision at Agra between an express and a goods train, killing 38 people.
 10 March 1986 – Khagaria rail disaster involved a collision in Bihar, killing over 50 people.
 8 July 1987 – Machieral rail disaster involved the derailment of the Delhi–Dakshin Express at Macherial, Andhra Pradesh, killing 53.
 15 March 1987 – Rockfort Express (Chennai–Tiruchi) plunged into a dry riverbed when a bomb exploded on a bridge over the Marudaiyar, near Ariyalur.  25 people were killed and several others injured.
 18 April 1988 – Lalitpur rail disaster involved a train derailment near Lalitpur, killing 75.
 8 July 1988 – Peruman railway accident occurred when the Island Express (Bangalore City–Thiruvananthapuram Central) derailed on the Peruman bridge and fell into Ashtamudi Lake, killing 105 people and injuring around 200.
14 May 1989 – Karnataka Express derailed, killing 69.
 1 November 1989 – Udyan Abha Toofan Express derailed in Sakaldiha, Uttar Pradesh killing at least 48.

1990s
 16 April 1990 – The Patna rail disaster involved a shuttle train consumed by fire near Patna, killing 70.
 6 June 1990 – A fire on a train at Gollaguda, in Andhra Pradesh, killed 36 people.
 25 June 1990 – A freight train collided with a passenger train at Mangra, Bihar, leading to 60 deaths.
 10 October 1990 – A train fire near Cherlapalli in Andhra Pradesh killed 40 people.
 12 December 1991 – The Kangra valley train suffered an accident near Jawali, Himachal Pradesh, killing 27.
 5 September 1992 – A train accident near Raigarh in Madhya Pradesh killed 41.
 16 January 1993 – The Howrah Rajdhani Express collided with a goods trains between Roorah and Ambiyapur flag stations.
 16 July 1993 – A train accident in Darbhanga district of Bihar killed 60.
 21 September 1993 – A Kota–Bina passenger train collided with a freight train near Chhabra in Rajasthan, killing 71.
 3 May 1994 – The Narayanadri Express collided with a tractor in Nalgonda district of Andhra Pradesh, killing 35.
 26 October 1994 – The 8001 DN Mumbai–Howrah Mail's sleeper coach caught fire in the early morning, killing 27.
 14 May 1995 – The Madras–Kanyakumari Express collided head-on with a freight train near Salem, killing 52.
 1 June 1995 – The Jammu Tawi Express from Kolkata collided with a stationary coal-laden goods train, killing 45 and injuring 335.
 1 June 1995 – Four carriages of the Hirakud Express derailed and fell down an embankment at Barpali, Orissa, causing 15 deaths.
 20 August 1995 – The Firozabad rail disaster occurred when the Purushottam Express collided with the stationary Kalindi Express near Firozabad, killing 400.
 18 April 1996 – A Gorakhpur–Gonda passenger train collided with a stationary freight train at Domingarh station near Gorakhpur, Uttar Pradesh, killing 60.
 14 May 1996 – An Ernakulam–Kayamkulam train collided with a bus at an unmanned level-crossing near Alappuzha, Kerala, killing 35 people in a marriage party.
 25 May 1996 – An Allahabad-bound passenger train collided with a tractor-trolley at an unmanned level-crossing near Varanasi, killing 25.
 30 December 1996 – The Brahmaputra Mail train bombing occurred when the Brahmaputra Mail was blasted by a bomb between Kokrajhar and Fakiragram stations in lower Assam, killing 33.
 18 April 1997 – Over 60 people are killed in a collision at Gorakhpur.
 8 July 1997 – A passenger train was blasted by a bomb at Lehra Khanna railway station, Bhatinda district, Punjab, killing 33.
 28 July 1997 – The Karnataka Express and Himsagar Express collided on the outskirts of Delhi, killing 12.
 14 September 1997 – Five cars of the Ahmedabad–Howrah Express plunged into a river in Bilaspur district, Madhya Pradesh, killing 81.
 4 April 1998 – The Fatuha train crash occurred when the Howrah–Danapur Express derailed near Fatuha Station on the Howrah–Delhi main line, killing 11 and injuring 50.
 24 April 1998 – 15 cars of a freight train collided with the Manmad–Kachiguda Express at Parli Vaijanath railway station in Maharashtra, killing 24 and injuring 32.
 13 August 1998 – The Chennai–Madurai Express train collided with a bus at an unmanned level-crossing on the new Karur-Salem bypass road on the outskirts of Karur town, killing 19 and injuring 27.
 24 September 1998 – A locomotive collided with a bus at an unmanned level-crossing near Bottalaapalem village in Andhra Pradesh, killing 20 (including 14 school children) and injuring 33.
 26 November 1998 – The Khanna rail disaster occurred when the Jammu Tawi–Sealdah Express collided with three derailed coaches of the Frontier Golden Temple Mail at Khanna, killing over 212 people.
 16 July 1999 – The 2616 UP Chennai–New Delhi Grand Trunk Express collided with derailed cars of a DN freight train on the Agra-Mathura section of the Central Railway, killing 17 and injuring over 200.
 2 August 1999 – The Gaisal train disaster occurred when the Brahmaputra Mail collided into the stationary Avadh Assam Express at Gaisal station in North Frontier Railway's Katihar division, killing at least 285 and injuring more than 300.

2000s
2 December 2000 – Howrah Amritsar Mail express collided with derailed coaches of goods train between Ambala Ludhiana. Over 45 killed and 150 persons injured.
 22 June 2001 – The Kadalundi train derailment occurred when the Mangalore–Chennai Mail commuter train was crossing Bridge 924 over the Kadalundi River and four carriages derailed and fell into the river, killing 52 and injuring as many as 300.
 27 February 2002 – The Sabarmati Express was attacked by a mob at Godhra station in Gujarat and four coaches were set on fire, killing 58 and wounding 43.
 13 May 2002 – The 2002 Jaunpur train crash occurred when sabotage derailed the Shramjeevi Express at Jaunpur, Uttar Pradesh, killing 12 and injuring 80.
 4 June 2002 – The Kasganj level crossing disaster occurred when a Kanpur–Kasganj Express collided with a passenger bus near the town of Kasganj, Uttar Pradesh, killing 30 and injuring 29.
 9 September 2002 – The Rafiganj train wreck occurred when the Howrah Rajdhani Express derailed on a bridge between Gaya and Dehri-on-Sone stations, with two coaches falling into a river, killing over 140. Terrorist sabotage was blamed.
 15 May 2003 – The Golden Temple Mail caught on fire in the early morning between Ludhiana and Ladhowal stations, killing 36 and injuring 15.
 22 June 2003 – The engine and first four coaches of Karwar–Mumbai Central Holiday Special derailed, killing 52 and injuring 26.
 2 July 2003 – The Golconda Express derailed at Warangal station, killing 21 and injuring 24.
 16 June 2004 – The Matsyagandha Express (Mangalore–Mumbai) derailed when it struck a boulder on the line, killing 14.
The accident was allegedly caused due to a fault in the telephone line, preventing proper signal warnings.
 28 July 2005 – The 2005 Jaunpur train bombing occurred when a bomb destroyed a carriage of the Shramjeevi Express near Jaunpur, Uttar Pradesh, killing 13 and injuring 50.
 3 October 2005 – The Datia rail accident occurred when the Bundelkhand Express, travelling at excessive speed, overshot a sharp turn and derailed near Datia, killing 16 and injuring more than 100.
 25 October 2005 – The Island Express had several coaches derail near Kamasamudram on the Bangalore–Jolarpettai section.
 29 October 2005 – The Valigonda train wreck occurred when the Delta Fast Passenger train derailed where a small rail bridge had been swept away by a flash flood, near the town of Valigonda, Andhra Pradesh, killing at least 114 and injuring over 200.
 11 July 2006 – The 2006 Mumbai train bombings were a series of coordinated bomb attacks on commuter trains in Mumbai, killing at least 200 and injuring over 700.
 20 November 2006 – The 2006 West Bengal train explosion occurred where there was an explosion, suspected to be a terrorist bombing, on a train near Belacoba station in West Bengal, killing 7 and injuring 53.
 1 December 2006 – The 150-year-old 'Ulta Pul' bridge in Bihar was being dismantled when a portion collapsed onto a passing Eastern Railways train, the Howrah – Jamalpur Super fast express (13071 up) killing 35 and injuring 17.
 18 February 2007 – The Delhi-Lahore Samjhauta Express was attacked by terrorists, causing 68 deaths.
 7 August 2007 – 32 passengers were injured when the Jodhpur–Howrah Express derails near Juhi Bridge, Kanpur.
 1 August 2008 – The Gowthami Express caught fire while crossing Kesamudram station in Andhra Pradesh, killing 40. The fire was supposedly caused by an electrical short circuit.
 13 February 2009 – The Coromandel Express caught fire to several carriages after leaving Jajpur Road station in Orissa.
 29 April 2009 – An Electric Multiple Unit of Southern Railways collided with empty oil tanker of a goods train at Vyasarpadi Jeeva station following a hijack, killing 4.
 20 October 2009 – The Mathura train collision occurred when the Goa Express collided with the rear carriage of the stationary Mewar Express outside Mathura, Uttar Pradesh, killing 21 and injuring several others. An investigation determined there was a faulty signal.

2010s

2010 
 2 January 2010 – The 2010 Uttar Pradesh train accidents were a series of three accidents that took place in Uttar Pradesh due to dense fog conditions.
 The Saryu Express hit a tractor trolley at an unmanned railway crossing in Pratapgarh. There were no injuries.
 3 January 2010 – Arunachal Pradesh Express derailed near Helem. No injuries were reported.
 16 January 2010 – Kalindi–Shram Shakti collision, near Tundla.
 17 January 2010 – Harihar–car collision at Barha railway crossing under Haidergarh police station area in Barabanki district.
 22 January 2010 – Goods train derailment near Azamgarh.
 25 May 2010 – A Rajdhani Express train derailed in Naugachia, Bihar, injuring 11. The train derailed as the driver applied emergency brakes after hearing a loud explosion.
 28 May 2010 – The Jnaneswari Express train derailment occurred when the Howrah–Lokmanya Tilak Terminus Jnaneswari Super Deluxe Express was derailed by an explosion then struck by an oncoming freight train between Khemashuli and Sardiha stations, killing at least 140 and injuring about 200. Maoists were suspected in the attack.
 4 June 2010 – The Coimbatore–Mettupalayam special train collided with a mini-bus at an unmanned level-crossing at Idigarai near Coimbatore, killing 5.
 18 June 2010 – The 8084 (Vasco-da GamaHowrah) Amaravati Express derailed after colliding with a road-roller at an unmanned level crossing near Koppal, Karnataka, injuring 27.
 19 July 2010 – The Sainthia train collision occurred when the Uttar Banga Express collided with the Vananchal Express at Sainthia railway station killing 66.
 8 August 2010 – Four people, including two foreigners, killed when the Chennai-Alappuzha superfast express collied with a car in an unmanned railway gate near Mararikulam on Ernakulam – Alappuzha coastal line. 
 17 August 2010 – A train accident occurred at Goryamau railway station of Barabanki district, killing 4.

2011 
 1 January 2011 – Akaltakth–trucks collision at Babura railway crossing in Jaunpur district.
 3 January 2011 – Goods train derailment at Dadri area of Ghaziabad district.
 7 July 2011 – A Mathura–Chhapra Express hit a bus at an unmanned level crossing in Thanagaon, Kanshiram Nagar district, Uttar Pradesh, killing 38 and injuring 30.
 10 July 2011 – The Fatehpur derailment occurred when the Kalka Mail derailed near Fatehpur, Uttar Pradesh, killing 70 people and injuring more than 300.
 10 July 2011 – The Guwahati–Puri Express derailed in Nalbari district, Assam, with the engine and four coaches rolling over in a rivulet, injuring more than 100. The derailment was determined to have been the result of a bomb attack by local militants.
 23 July 2011 – A second freight train had eight cars derail at almost the same place as the previous incident, less than 24 hours earlier.
 31 July 2011 – The Guwahati–Bangalore Kaziranga Express derailed and was hit by another train in Malda district, West Bengal, killing at least 3 and injuring 200.
 13 September 2011 – A Chennai suburban MEMU (Mainline Electric Multiple Unit) commuter train collided with a stationary Arakonam–Katpadi passenger train between Melpakkam and Chitheri stations in Vellore district, killing 10 and injuring many others.
 22 November 2011 – A Howrah–Dehradun Doon Express caught fire in two coaches, killing 7.

2012
 11 January 2012 – The Brahmaputra Mail collided with a stationary freight train, killing 5 and injuring 9.
 26 February 2012 – The Trivandrum–Kozhikode Jan Shatabdi Express struck people who were standing on the track to watch fireworks, killing 3 and injuring 1.
 20 March 2012 – A train collided with an overcrowded taxi minivan at an unmanned railroad crossing in northern Uttar Pradesh,  from Lucknow, killing 15.
 26 March 2012 – A MEMU commuter train collided with a boulder-carrying truck at the Kannamangala gate on the outskirts of Bangalore, killing the pilot and driver.
 22 May 2012 – The Hubli–Bangalore Hampi Express collided with a freight train near Penukonda in Andhra Pradesh, killing 14 and injuring 35.
 31 May 2012 – The Howrah–Dehradun Doon Express derailed near Jaunpur, killing at least 7 and injuring 15.
 19 July 2012 – The Vidarbha Express collided with a local train near Khardi station on the Mumbai–Kasara route, killing 1 and injuring 4.
 30 July 2012 – Tamil Nadu Express caught fire near Nellore in Andhra Pradesh, killing 47 and injuring 25.
 30 Nov 2012 – Grand Trunk Express caught fire to at least two coaches near Gwalior, killing several people.
 19 December 2012 – Indore–Yesvantpur Express collided with a truck near Sankhapur in Medak district, injuring many people.
 20 December 2012 – The locomotive of the PuneErnakulam Superfast Express derailed at Lanja village near Nivsar. There were no injuries.
 26 December 2012 – Head on collision between 55908 Dn Ledo – Dibrugarh Town passenger and Light Engine between Chabua and Panitola on New Tinsukia – Dibrugarh Town section of Tinsukia division of Northeast Frontier Railway. Injuring 71 persons.

2013
 10 April 2013 – The 15228 Muzaffarpur–Yesvantpur Weekly Express derailed several carriages near Arakkonam,  from Chennai, killing 1 and injuring 1.
 19 August 2013 – The Dhamara Ghat train accident occurred when the 12567 Saharsa–Patna Rajya Rani Superfast Express ran over passengers disembarking from another train at the Dhamara station in Bihar, killing 35.
 2 November 2013 – The 13352 Alappuzha–Dhanbad Express ran over passengers of the 57271 Vijayawada–Rayagada passenger train who had jumped onto the adjacent track due to a rumor that their train was on fire. 10 people were killed and at least 20 injured.
 13 November 2013 – The 2013 Chapramari Forest train accident occurred when a passenger train struck a herd of 40 elephants in the Chapramari Wildlife Sanctuary in West Bengal, killing 7 Indian elephants and injuring 10 others. The train was travelling at twice the speed limit.
 28 December 2013 – The 16594 Bangalore City–Hazur Sahib Nanded Express caught fire near Kothacheruvu in Andhra Pradesh, killing at least 26 and injuring 12.

2014
 20 March 2014 – A local train had six coaches uncouple and derail at Titwala,  from Chhatrapati Shivaji Terminus, killing 1 and injuring 9.
 1 May 2014 – The 2014 Chennai train bombing occurred when two low-intensity bombs exploded on the Guwahati–Bangalore Kaziranga Express at Chennai Central railway station, killing 1 and injuring 14.
 4 May 2014 – The 50105 Diva Junction-Sawantvadi Passenger train derailed between Nagothane and Roha stations, killing about 20 and injuring 100.
 26 May 2014 – The 12556 Gorakhdham Express collided with a stationary freight train near Khalilabad station in Uttar Pradesh, killing at least 25 and injuring over 50.
 25 June 2014 – The 12236 Dibrugarh Rajdhani Express derailed near Chapra town, Bihar, killing 4 and injuring 8.
 23 July 2014 – Medak district bus-train collision; a Nanded-Secunderabad passenger train collided with a school bus at an unmanned level-crossing in Masaipet village of Medak district, killing 20.

2015
 13 February 2015 – The Anekal derailment occurred when the 12677 Bangalore City–Ernakulam Intercity Express derailed nine coaches near Anekal in the Bangalore Urban district, killing 12 and injuring 100.
 20 March 2015 – The 2015 Uttar Pradesh train accident occurred when the Dehradun–Varanasi Janta Express derailed in Rae Bareli, Uttar Pradesh, killing 58 and injuring 150.
 25 May 2015 – The Muri Express derailed in Uttar Pradesh, killing 5 and injuring more than 50.
 4 August 2015 – The Harda twin train derailment occurred when the Kamayani Express and Janata Express derailed between Kurawan and Bhiringi stations in Madhya Pradesh, killing at least 31 people and injuring 100. Flash floods caused by Cyclonic Storm Komen dislodged a culvert causing a track misalignment, and several carriages of the 11071 Kamayani Express fell into the Machak river.
On 4 September 2015, 5 coaches including 3 AC coaches and an Unreserved coach along with SLR of 16859 DOWN Chennai Egmore – Mangalore Central Express derailed near Puvanur railway station, Villupuram – Vridhachalam section of Chord line. 39 passengers were reported injured.
 12 September 2015 – A chartered Kalka–Shimla Shivalik Queen narrow-gauge railway derailed 3 coaches near Taksal, killing 2 and injuring 13. The train was boarded by a party of 36 customers and a tour operator, all from Britain. The Kalka-Shimla Railway is a part of the Mountain railways of India which has been enlisted as a UNESCO World Heritage Site since 2008.

2016
5 February 2016 – 4 coaches of the Kanyakumari-Bengaluru Island Express derailed near Patchur station. A few people were injured.
6 May 2016 – Chennai Central–Thiruvananthapuram Central Superfast Express and a suburban train had a side collision near Pattabiram, injuring 7.
27 August 2016 –  Twelve coaches of the Thiruvananthapuram-Mangaluru Express derailed near Karukutty station on the Ernakulam – Thrissur section in Kerala. No casualties reported.
29 September 2016 –  A collision between Bhubaneswar-Bhadrak passenger train and a goods train at Cuttack, Odisha. One person killed and 22 injured.
6 December 2016 –  Rajendra Nagar-Guwahati Capital Express derailed at Samuktala Road station in Alipurduar district, West Bengal killing 2 people and injuring 6.
28 December 2016 –  Five coaches of Kurla-Ambarnath local train derailed in Mumbai. No injuries reported.
28 December 2016 – 15 coaches of the Ajmer-Sealdah Express derailed near Rura station while crossing a bridge, injuring 44.

2017
21 January 2017 – The Kuneru train derailment occurred when the 18448 Jagdalpur–Bhubaneswar Hirakhand Express derailed near Kuneru, Vizianagaram, killing 41 and injuring 69.
7 March 2017 – The 2017 Bhopal–Ujjain Passenger train bombing occurred when a bomb exploded on the Bhopal–Ujjain Passenger at Jabri railway station, injuring 10. This was the first strike in India by the Islamic State.
30 March 2017 –  Eight coaches of Mahakaushal Express derailed near Uttar Pradesh's Kulpahar, injuring 52.
15 April 2017 – 8 coaches of the Meerut–Lucknow Rajya Rani Express derailed near Rampur; injuring at least 24.
19 August 2017 – The 18478 PuriHaridwar Kalinga Utkal Express derailed in Khatauli near Muzaffarnagar, Uttar Pradesh. Killing at least 23 and leaving around 97 injured.
23 August 2017 – Auraiya train derailment occurred when the Kaifiyat Express (12225) derailed between Pata and Achalda railway stations around 02:40 am (IST). Around 100 people were injured.
24 November 2017 –  Vasco Da Gama-Patna Express derailment occurred in Chitrakoot, Uttar Pradesh killing three people and leaving around nine injured.
24 November 2017 –  Wagons of the Paradeep-Cuttack goods train loaded with imported coal derailed between Goraknath-Raghunathpur. No one was injured.

2018

25 April 2018 – Front wheels of WDP4D numbered 40405 which hauled 12606 UP Karaikkudi – Chennai Pallavan Superfast Express derailed while entering Tiruchchirappalli Junction railway station at 6:27 am. It was reported due to rail fracture, no injures and casualties reported. Then train was moved further with the delay of three hours towards Chennai.
6 May 2018 – The WAP 4 loco of train 12810 Howrah-Mumbai Mail caught fire and resulted in death of assistant loco pilot and injury to loco pilot between Talni and Dhamangaon on Wardha – Badnera section. The enquiry stated that the fire was due to a defect in the loco.
24 July 2018 – 5 killed, 4 injured in accident at St Thomas Mount station on Chennai Beach – Tambaram section. The victims were passengers on a Chennai Beach-Tirumalpur local (No 40701) who were hanging out from the doors when they were struck by a wall. This was unexpected because the train normally stopped at another platform but was diverted to this platform. 4 died on the spot.
10 October 2018 – New Farakka Express accident: 7 Killed as Engine, 9 Coaches Derail in UP's Raebareli
19 October 2018 – Amritsar train disaster: About 59 people were killed and about 100 injured when a train ran into a crowd of spectators who were standing on the tracks watching the Dusshera festival in Amritsar.

2019 
3 February 2019 – Seemanchal Express derailment: 11 coaches derailed near Sahadai Buzurg railway station, about 50 km from Patna.
31 March 2019 – 13 coaches of Tapti Ganga Express derailed near Gautamsthan railway station.
20 April 2019 – 12 coaches of Poorva Express derailed in the outskirt of Kanpur Central near Rooma. No fatality was reported and 15 people were injured.
29 August 2019 – Fire broke out in two coaches of Telangana Express at Asaoti railway station in Haryana.
11 November 2019 – 16 passengers were injured and motorman killed when Lingampalli bound MMTS rammed into incoming Hundry Express at Kacheguda station. Hundry express had been given signal to enter the station when the outbound MMTS rammed into the train at the points.

2020s

2020
8 May 2020 – Aurangabad railway accident: 16 migrant workers sleeping on rail tracks were killed when a goods train ran over them between Jalna and Aurangabad districts.
22 July 2020 – 3 railway employees from Hyderabad died after a double engine train ran over them. The incident took place between Vikarabad and Chittigadda railway station. The incident raised concerns about the safety of the railway employees and seems to be due to negligence from higher authorities.

2021
The parcel bogey of Malabar Express caught fire between Varkala and Paravur near Edavai railway station with no casualties.
Two railway employees died after they were run over by a speeding express train when they were engaged in their routine track inspection work in Telangana's Mahabubabad district. They were working on track-1 when they noticed a train approaching on the track. They crossed to track-2 for safety. However, they failed to notice another train – Konark Superfast Express approaching on track-2 and were fatally hit by it.
Two railway employees were fatally hit by a goods train while repairing a railway signal near Ambur railway station of Southern Railways. Reason for the accident stated by Railway Protection Force is due to heavy rain they couldn't hear the sound of the train at the same time loco pilot didn't have a clear visibility to spot them.
Four coaches including the pantry car of Guwahati-Howrah Saraighat COVID Special Train derailed at Chaygaon railway station on 25 August 2021.

2022
Coaches of the Bikaner–Guwahati Express derailed near New Domohani railway station at around 4:50 pm on 13 January 2022, causing 9 dead.
Pawan Express derails near Nashik on 3 April causing two injuries.
25 March 2022 – Two Trackmen were fatally hit by 22209 Mumbai–New Delhi Duronto Express when they were engaged in their track inspection work between Navsari and Maroil Railway Station, they failed to notice the approaching train and at the same loco pilot didn't have a clear visibility due to Heavy Fog.

2023 

 2 January 2023 – 11 coaches of Suryanagri Express derailed five minutes after it left Marwar Junction railway station at 3:27 am.10 injured 0 killed.

See also
Domestic:
 Commission of Railway Safety
 Traffic collisions in India
 :Category:Railway accident deaths in India

International:
 Classification of railway accidents
 List of rail accidents
 List of rail accidents by country
 List of terrorist incidents involving railway systems
 List of accidents and disasters by death toll#Rail accidents and disasters

References

Further reading

External links
 Public Information of Indian Railways Accidents via safety.indianrail.gov.in
 List of serious railway accidents inquired into by the Commissioners of Railway Safety – from the Commission of Railway Safety
 

 
Lists of rail transport accidents and incidents by country
Indian railway-related lists